Multi-Mission Space Exploration Vehicle (MMSEV) may refer to:
Space Exploration Vehicle, a modular spacecraft/rover being developed by NASA
Nautilus-X, a proposed spacecraft for long-term missions to the Moon or Mars